Michael Halliday (born 28 May 1979) is a footballer from Northern Ireland who plays in the NIFL Championship for Knockbreda.

Halliday is from East Belfast and started his career at Glentoran (of whom he is a lifelong supporter), where he played for 11 years and won many trophies. Due to his loyalty the club, he was offered a testimonial in 2009.

On 15 May 2010, Halliday signed a 3-year contract with North Belfast club Crusaders. He arrived on a free transfer after being released from Glentoran by new manager Scott Young at the end of the 2009/2010 season.

He had the perfect start to this Crues career, scoring on his league debut against Donegal Celtic, and on 2 October 2010, Halliday scored the winning goal against his old side Glentoran to close the gap on the leaders. He also scored in the Irish Cup semi final against Portadown, to put the Crues into their second final in 3 years.

Halliday and Crusaders team-mate Ryan McCann joined Lisburn Distillery in the summer of 2012.

In the summer of 2018 Halliday joined Bangor FC and has since become a club legend. He helped Bangor return to the Irish League, scoring 28 goals for the Seasiders in the 2018/19 season. He had a brief spell acting as caretaker manager alongside Michael Dougherty at Bangor in the Covid-hit Spring of 2020, but continued his playing career afterwards at the club.  In October 2022, at the age of 43, Michael came off the bench to score both goals for Bangor in a 2-1 extra time win over Albert Foundry in the Intermediate Cup. Michael is the oldest player to have ever play for Bangor. 

Attended The Royal Belfast Academical Institution

Honours
Glentoran
 Irish Premier League (3): 2002–03, 2004–05, 2008–09 
 Irish Cup (2): 2000–01, 2003–04
 Irish League Cup (5): 2000–01, 2002–03, 2004–05, 2006–07, 2009–10
 County Antrim Shield (4): 2000–01, 2001–02, 2002–03, 2007–08
 Gold Cup (1): 2000–01

Crusaders
Irish League Cup (1): 2011–12
Setanta Cup (1): 2012

Bangor
McReynolds Cup (1): 2018–19
Ballymena & Provincial Intermediate League (1): [[2018–19 Ballymena & Provincial Intermediate League]|2018–19]]

External links
 Official Glentoran website
 Halliday is key to Glens hopes
 Halliday sees Glens through
 Happy Halliday is Glens Cup hero

External links
 Official Bangor Football Club website

References

Crusaders F.C. players
Glentoran F.C. players
Association footballers from Belfast
1979 births
Living people
Association football forwards
Knockbreda F.C. players
Association footballers from Northern Ireland